Anders Johansson Smith (born 19 January 1968) is a Swedish former professional footballer who played as a midfielder.

References

1968 births
Living people
Swedish footballers
Halmstads BK players
Association football midfielders
Allsvenskan players